Eli Beer (born September 13, 1973 in Israel) is the founder of United Hatzalah of Israel, and President of the U.S.-based organization Friends of United Hatzalah.
United Hatzalah of Israel is an independent, non-profit, fully-volunteer emergency medical services organization that provides fast and free emergency medical first response throughout Israel.

Early life and education 

On June 2, 1978, Beer witnessed the bombing of the #12 bus. He was struck by the chaos of the incident and the dearth of emergency rescue resources. This traumatic experience inspired him to volunteer on an ambulance at the age of 15, while attending school and working in his family's book and real estate business.

At the age of 17 Beer realized that a more flexible system had to be established to improve emergency response times. He was familiar with the Hatzalah model established in the United States and began to organize a similar model by launching a volunteer unit in his Jerusalem neighborhood. This unit purchased their own communication gear, medical equipment and supplies and was funded by the community. The organization re-imagined emergency medical first response by training EMT volunteers to respond to local medical emergencies ahead of ambulances and arrive in less than three minutes in order to provide first aid medical treatment and keep patients alive until ambulances could arrive.

Hatzalah Israel and United Hatzalah of Israel 

Beer began to work with Hatzalah Jerusalem in 1992. With him as fundraiser and operational coordinator the organization grew and changed its name to Hatzalah Israel reflecting its nationwide scope. Hatzalah Israel acted as an umbrella organization, incorporating many Hatzalah chapters that had been established throughout the country.

In 2002, following a terror attack in the Beit Yisroel neighborhood of Jerusalem where first response was slowed by the narrow roadways and congestion created by the panic in the neighborhood, a volunteer from the organization came up with the idea of having first responders arrive with a full complement of medical equipment on motorcycles in order to cut through traffic and arrive at the scenes of medical emergencies even faster. This gave birth to the 'ambucycle' a term coined by the organization to fit the newly created ambulance-motorcycle. Inside each of these vehicles is a full complement of medical equipment carried by a regular ambulance with the exception of a backboard, stair-chair, and bed.      

Following the Second Lebanon War in 2006 Beer unified numerous smaller Hatzalah organizations from around the country and changed the name of the organization to United Hatzalah to represent the newly unified organization divided into branches and the partnership of Jewish, Muslim, Druze and Christian volunteers from all religious spectrums working together in order to save lives. 

United Hatzalah established its reputation as an EMS organization by being at the forefront of medical innovation. It was the first EMS to introduce the Ambucycle, a motorcycle equipped with all the medical equipment of an ambulance aside from a stretcher, which allowed its volunteer first responders to reach the patient on average of 3 minutes across Israel, 8 to 15 minutes ahead of the first ambulance. In 2008, United Hatzalah launched Israel's first GPS-based dispatch system, which was able to locate and dispatch the five closest EMS responders within 3 seconds of the emergency. 

In nearly 30 years since Eli began the organization, it has grown to include more than 6,000 volunteer medical first responders including EMTs, paramedics, and doctors, who responded to more than 540,000 medical emergencies in 2020. All services are provided free of charge to all people regardless of race, nationality, or religion. 
 
Beer's vision is to bring United Hatzalah's life-saving model to other communities across the world. In 2015, he expanded internationally with the establishment of branches in South America, and other countries, including "United Rescue" in Jersey City, N.J. in the United States, where the response time was reduced to just two minutes and thirty-five seconds as a result. 

During his voluntary career as an EMT, Beer has been a medical responder at the scenes of the Ben Yehuda Street bombings, the Versailles Wedding Hall disaster, the Second Lebanon War in the north, and Operation Cast Lead in the south as well as dozens of other major terror attacks and mass casualty incidents.

Recognition

Social Entrepreneur of the Year, Israel (2010) 
Beer received the Social Entrepreneur Award from the Schwab Foundation for Social Entrepreneurship in cooperation with the World Economic Forum of Davos in 2010. The award is given to those driving social innovation and transformation in various fields including education, health, environment and enterprise development.

Presidential Award for Volunteerism, Israel (2011) 
Beer received the Presidential Award for Volunteerism from Shimon Peres, the President of the State of Israel in 2011. The award is given to individuals and groups whose volunteering effort is deemed to be outstanding in a given year by a committee. Twelve awardees are chosen each year.

Young Global Leader, Davos (2012) 
Nominated by a committee chaired by H.M. Queen Rania Al Abdullah of Jordan for his efforts to create a multicultural, apolitical medical rescue organization, Beer was chosen to become one of the World Economic Forum's Young Global Leaders in 2012. Young Global Leaders come from 65 countries and are honored for their outstanding leadership, professional accomplishments and commitment to society.

The Victor J. Goldberg IIE Prize for Peace in the Middle East (2013) 
The Institute of International Education (IIE) awards the Victor J. Goldberg IIE Prize for Peace in the Middle East annually to recognize outstanding work being conducted jointly by two individuals, one Arab and one Israeli, working together to advance the cause of peace in the Middle East. Beer received the prize together with Murad Alian, the Coordinator of United Hatzalah's East Jerusalem Team.

World Values Network, Champion of Human Life Award (2016) 
Beer received the Champion of Human Life Award at the Fourth Annual Champions of Jewish Values International Awards Gala, sponsored by the World Values Network, a prestigious platform established by Rabbi Shmuley Boteach, recognizing those who strive to positively affect society.

Conference of European Rabbis, Internet Entrepreneur Prize (2017) 
The CER Prize is awarded to digital and web-based ventures that have potential to change the world and improve lives. Beer was awarded the CER Internet Entrepreneur Prize in Helsinki, for developing United Hatzalah's LifeCompass app, which automatically dispatches the five closest EMT responders within three seconds of an emergency.

Additional achievements 
Eli was invited to be a speaker in April 2013 on TEDMED, an annual conference about health and medicine. His talk was later featured on the TED website. He also spoke at the TEDx Gateway conference in India in February 2020.

Personal life 
Eli is married to Gitty, and they have five children: four girls and a boy.

References

External links
 

1973 births
Living people
American activists
American Orthodox Jews
American people of Israeli descent
Israeli Orthodox Jews
Jewish American activists